Michael Lavalette (born 1962) is a member of the Socialist Workers Party and former local councillor in Preston, Lancashire, England. He was first elected as a Socialist Alliance candidate shortly after the Iraq War began in 2003. In 2007, he was re-elected, this time standing for the Respect Party. In the Respect split in 2007 he remained loyal to the SWP and broke with George Galloway. Re-elected in 2012 as an Independent Socialist, he was affiliated with TUSC until he retired from his seat in 2015.

He is Everton Professor of Social and Community Engagement at Liverpool Hope University, formerly having worked at both Liverpool and Central Lancashire universities. Along with Chris Jones, Iain Feguson, and Laura Penketh, he was an author of the Social Work manifesto for a new engaged practice and organiser of the Liverpool and Glasgow conferences of the Social Work Action Network (SWAN), which stands in the radical social work tradition and seeks to oppose the increased managerialism and privatisation within the social work profession, and to promote social work practice based on principles of social justice.

At the end of 2008 the Social Work Action Network ran a campaign defending social workers in the aftermath of the Baby P tragedy. Shortly after, along with Iain Ferguson, he wrote a polemical pamphlet called 'Social Work After Baby P' that included significant contributions from academics, practitioners and senior trade union officers.

Lavalette originally joined his local Labour Party in North Ayrshire at the age of 16 in 1979, but by January 1981 he had left to join the SWP. In the early 1990s he moved to Preston for work and became politically active in the local labour movement.

In Preston he is the co-ordinator of the local Stop the War Coalition. He organised a solidarity day in Preston for victims of the Asian Tsunami and has led campaigns against hospital privatisation, Islamophobia, the wars in the Middle East and support for local trade unionists on strike.

In May 2007 he was re-elected to Preston council and held his seat until May 2011, when he lost it to Labour. In December 2010  Lavalette proposed a motion to Preston City Council calling for opposition to cuts, job losses and privatisations. The motion had the backing of the local trades council and of 'Preston Against Cuts'. 5 Labour councillors had voted and spoken in favour of this motion at these meetings. When it came to the full council meeting however, all the Labour councillors voted against this motion, and for an amendment supporting 'fairer' cuts backed by the Liberals and Tories.

In May 2012, he contested the seat again as a Trade Unionist and Socialist Coalition supported candidate and was re-elected.

Lavalette regularly contributes to the Lancashire Evening Post.

Electoral history

2003 Local Election
Lavalette stood as a  Socialist Alliance Against the War candidate. He was well known in the area as the leader of the local Stop the War Coalition. The "Against The War" label  was crucial in gaining him victory in a ward with over 40% Muslim voters. George Galloway was alleged to have backed Michael Lavalette in this election, which was one of the charges that led to George Galloway being expelled from the Labour Party.

2004 European Election
In 2004 he was the lead candidate in the Respect list for the 2004 European Election in the North West England region.

2005 General Election
In 2005 he stood as a Respect candidate in the Parliamentary elections for Preston coming fourth with almost 7% of the vote, saving his deposit.

2007 Local Election
Lavalette kept his council seat, Preston Town Centre,  with 1179 votes (more than 52%) increasing his majority by over 19%.

2011 Local Election
In May 2011 he lost his seat to Labour. He stood as a Trade Unionist and Socialist Coalition candidate because the SWP had left Respect in 2007 and since joined TUSC.

2012 Local Election
Lavalette successfully stood as an independent in 2012 in the ward which he has always stood in, Town Centre. Due to making the decision to stand at the last minute he did not have time to gain documents giving him the right to stand for Trade Unionist and Socialist Coalition so had to stand as an independent candidate.

Published works

The Forgotten Workforce: Scottish Children at Work (1991)(Glasgow, Scottish Low Pay Unit) 
Child employment in the capitalist labour market (1994) (Aldershot, Ashgate) 
Solidarity on the waterfront: the Liverpool lock out of 1995/96 (with Jane Kennedy) (1996) (Liverpool, Liver Press) 
Social policy: a conceptual and theoretical introduction (edited with Alan Pratt) (1996)(London, Sage) 
Anti-racism and social welfare (edited with Laura Penketh and Chris Jones) (1998) (Aldershot, Ashgate) 
A thing of the past?: child labour in Britain in the nineteenth and twentieth centuries (editor) (1999)(Liverpool, Liverpool University Press) 
Child labor: a world history companion (with Sandy Hobbs and Jim McKechnie) (1999)(New York, ABC-CLIO) 
Class struggle and social welfare (edited with Gerry Mooney) (2000)(London, Routledge)
Social Policy: A conceptual and theoretical introduction (second edition) (Edited with Alan Pratt)(2001) (London, Sage) 
Leadership and social movements (edited with Colin Barker and Alan Johnson)(Manchester, MUP) (2001) 
Rethinking social welfare: a critical perspective (with Iain Ferguson and Gerry Mooney) (2002)(London, Sage) 
Children, welfare and the state (edited with Barry Goldson and Jim McKechnie) (2002)(London, Sage)
A Palestine Journey; Respect For Palestine (pamphlet)
Globalisation, global justice and social work (edited with Iain Ferguson and Elizabeth Whitmore)(2005)(London, Sage)
Social Policy: Theories, concepts and issues (Third Edition) (Edited with Alan Pratt) (2006) (London, Sage) 
George Lansbury and the rebel councillors of Poplar (foreword by George Galloway) (2006)(London, Bookmarks) 
International Social Work and the Radical Tradition (edited with Iain Ferguson) (2007)(Birmingham, Venture Press) 
Social Work After Baby P: Issues debates and Alternative Perspectives(Edited with Iain Ferguson) (2009) (Liverpool, Liverpool Hope University Press) 
Radical Social Work Today (Editor) (2011)(Bristol, Policy Press) 
Social Work in Extremis (edited with Vassilios Ioakimidis) (2011) (Bristol, Policy Press) 
Voices From the West Bank (with Chris Jones) (2011) (London, Bookmarks) 
Capitalism and Sport: Politics, Protest, People and Play (editor) (2013) (London, Bookmarks)

References

External links
Forward thinking
Group will fight 'academy' plan, Lancashire Evening Post
Academies head to head, This Is Lancashire
Michael Lavlette quoted on 'Kid Power'

1962 births
Living people
British anti-war activists
Councillors in Lancashire
Respect Party councillors
Respect Party parliamentary candidates
Socialist Workers Party (UK) members